The 1923 Lombard Olive football team was an American football team that represented Lombard College during the 1923 college football season. In its third year under head coach Paul J. Schissler, the team compiled a 6–1 record.

Schedule

References

Lombard
Lombard Olive football seasons
Interstate Intercollegiate Athletic Conference football champion seasons
Lombard Olive football